Kukas is a village and industrial town near Jaipur. It is about 10 km from Amber Fort. The presence of a RIICO industrial park in Kukas has led to the development of many local colleges, Hotels and businesses to support the industrial park. Kukas is situated on Delhi National Highway.

Industries 
RIICO has allowed many industries to develop in this area, some of them being:
 Eicher Polaris Private Limited
 Azad Coach Private Limited
 Ericsson Supply Site 
 Rajasthan Fasteners Private Limited
 Hero MotoCorp, Center for Innovation and Technology

Colleges 
The advancement of RIICO has allowed many colleges to develop in this area being:
 Jaipur Engineering College
 Jaipur Institute of Engineering and Technology
 Arya Institute of Engineering & Technology
 Arya College of Engineering & I.T.
 Arya College | Arya Group of Colleges
 Shankara Institute of Engineering and Technology
 Pearl Academy of Fashion
 Cambay Institute of Hospitality Management

Transport 
Kukas can be mostly reached via buses. Government bus service can be taken from Sindhi Camp bus stand of Jaipur and Badi Chaupar bus stop of Old Jaipur. Private bus services include buses on route no. 29 . JCTSL also runs AC1 on this route, which are run by the Rajasthan government.

Hotels 
The area comprises some hotels and spas.

 Tree of life Jaipur
 Le Meridian
 Cambay Resort
 Shiv Vilas
 Heritage Retreat
 Gold Palace
 Lohagarh Fort Resort
 Hotel Umaid Residency
 Hotel Fairmont Jaipur

Temples 
 Sada Shiv Jyotriling Mhadev Mandir
 Shree Sai Mandir
 Shree RadhaGovind Dev Mandir 160 yr old

References 

Cities and towns in Jaipur district